Blagota Sekulić (born March 14, 1982) is a Montenegrin professional basketball coach and former player.

Professional career
In his professional career, Sekulić has played with Budućnost Podgorica and Partizan in his country and won 4 Yugoslav Basketball League championships then played for AEK Athens, Maroussi, PAOK, Aris in Greece, Real Madrid, Murcia and CB Canarias in Spain, Alba Berlin in Germany and Vanoli Cremona in Italy.

In February 2014, he signed with the Turkish club Fenerbahçe Ülker for the rest of the 2013–14 season. In the summer of 2014 he returned to Canarias.

On July 14, 2016, Sekulić signed with Spanish team Montakit Fuenlabrada. On September 17, 2018, Sekulić signed a one-year deal with Delteco GBC of the Liga ACB.

National team career
Sekulić played for the Montenegro national basketball team at the EuroBasket 2013.

References

External links
 Blagota Sekulić at acb.com
 Blagota Sekulić at legabasket.it
 Blagota Sekulić at euroleague.net
 Blagota Sekulić at eurobasket.com
 Blagota Sekulić at fiba.com
 Blagota Sekulić at tblstat.net

1982 births
Living people
AEK B.C. players
Alba Berlin players
Aris B.C. players
Baloncesto Fuenlabrada players
CB Canarias players
CB Murcia players
Fenerbahçe men's basketball players
Gipuzkoa Basket players
KK Budućnost players
KK Partizan players
Liga ACB players
Maroussi B.C. players
Montenegrin basketball coaches
Montenegrin expatriate basketball people in Greece
Montenegrin expatriate basketball people in Italy
Montenegrin expatriate basketball people in Serbia
Montenegrin expatriate basketball people in Spain
Montenegrin expatriate basketball people in Turkey
Montenegrin men's basketball players
P.A.O.K. BC players
Power forwards (basketball)
Real Madrid Baloncesto players
Sportspeople from Podgorica
Vanoli Cremona players